Andrew Eccles (born 1 June 1979) is a former Australian rules footballer who played in the Australian Football League.

Eccles played TAC Cup football for the Northern Knights, and was recruited to the AFL in the 1996 AFL Draft by the Adelaide Football Club.

Eccles did not play an AFL game in his first season with the Crows, playing for Norwood in the SANFL where he was selected at pick 1 in the mini draft. The 17 year old Eccles played a majority of the season in Reserves for Norwood.

He made his AFL debut in the 1998 season, playing 18 games and earning a rising star nomination in round 19. Playing on the wing he was the youngest member of Adelaide's 1998 AFL Grand Final winning team.

Hamstring, knee and Achilles tendon injuries affected his performance over the next three seasons, playing only 22 AFL games.

He was traded to Carlton at the end of the 2001 season as a straight swap for Kris Massie. His time at Carlton was generally unsuccessful, and he was delisted at the end of 2003.

After being delisted, he played for North Ballarat in the VFL from 2004 until 2005. He was selected in the VFL Team of the Year in 2004.

Career
Adelaide: 1998–2001, 41 games, 22 goals.
Carlton: 2002–03, 13 games, 2 goals.

Statistics

|-
|- style="background-color: #EAEAEA"
|style="text-align:center;background:#afe6ba;"|1998†
|style="text-align:center;"|
| 33 || 18 || 13 || 7 || 112 || 57 || 169 || 40 || 26 || 0.7 || 0.4 || 6.2 || 3.2 || 9.4 || 2.2 || 1.4
|-
! scope="row" style="text-align:center" | 1999
|style="text-align:center;"|
| 33 || 8 || 4 || 2 || 81 || 39 || 120 || 19 || 11 || 0.5 || 0.3 || 10.1 || 4.9 || 15.0 || 2.4 || 1.4
|- style="background-color: #EAEAEA"
! scope="row" style="text-align:center" | 2000
|style="text-align:center;"|
| 33 || 10 || 4 || 5 || 103 || 43 || 146 || 43 || 12 || 0.4 || 0.5 || 10.3 || 4.3 || 14.6 || 4.3 || 1.2
|-
! scope="row" style="text-align:center" | 2001
|style="text-align:center;"|
| 33 || 5 || 1 || 1 || 37 || 7 || 44 || 10 || 6 || 0.2 || 0.2 || 7.4 || 1.4 || 8.8 || 2.0 || 1.2
|- style="background-color: #EAEAEA"
! scope="row" style="text-align:center" | 2002
|style="text-align:center;"|
| 20 || 11 || 2 || 3 || 94 || 41 || 135 || 35 || 24 || 0.2 || 0.3 || 8.5 || 3.7 || 12.3 || 3.2 || 2.2
|-
! scope="row" style="text-align:center" | 2003
|style="text-align:center;"|
| 20 || 2 || 0 || 0 || 4 || 3 || 7 || 0 || 6 || 0.0 || 0.0 || 2.0 || 1.5 || 3.5 || 0.0 || 3.0
|- class="sortbottom"
! colspan=3| Career
! 54
! 24
! 18
! 431
! 190
! 621
! 147
! 85
! 0.4
! 0.3
! 8.0
! 3.5
! 11.5
! 2.7
! 1.6
|}

Player Honours
 1998 Premiership Player

References

External links

Adelaide Football Club players
Adelaide Football Club Premiership players
Carlton Football Club players
North Ballarat Football Club players
1979 births
Living people
Northern Knights players
Australian rules footballers from Victoria (Australia)
One-time VFL/AFL Premiership players